Fatima Zahra Hafdi, known professionally as , is a Canadian singer and songwriter based in France. She is set to represent France in the Eurovision Song Contest 2023 in Liverpool, United Kingdom, with the song "Évidemment".

Biography 
Hafdi was born in Montreal, Canada, to Francophone Canadian parents of Moroccan descent. During her childhood, she lived between Montreal and Longueuil, where her family finally settled. She rose to prominence in 2016, when she released her debut single "Printemps blanc", in collaboration with French rapper Niro.

In 2021, she increased her fame with the single "Tu t'en iras", which was regularly broadcast on radio and televisions. The single was certified platinum by Syndicat National de l'Édition Phonographique (SNEP). In the same year, La Zarra was nominated for the NRJ Music Awards, the leading French music awards, as Francophone revelation of the year, boosted in part by the success of her debut album Traîtrise.

On 12 January 2023, she was chosen by France Télévisions to represent France at the Eurovision Song Contest 2023, becoming the second Canadian singer to represent the country after Natasha St-Pier in 2001.

Discography

Studio albums

Singles

As lead artist

As featured artist

Awards and nominations

References

External links 

  

21st-century Canadian women singers
Canadian women pop singers

Living people
Canadian people of Moroccan descent
Singers from Montreal
Polydor Records artists
Eurovision Song Contest entrants for France
Eurovision Song Contest entrants of 2023
Canadian expatriates in France
French-language singers of Canada
Year of birth missing (living people)